Frenemy is an oxymoron and a portmanteau of "friend" and "enemy" that refers to "a person with whom one is friendly, despite a fundamental dislike or rivalry" or "a person who combines the characteristics of a friend and an enemy".

Frenemies may also refer to:
 Frenemies (film), a 2012 teen comedy-drama television film based on the novel of the same name
 "Frenemies" (Glee), an episode of the TV series Glee
 "Frenemies" (Sex and the City), an episode of the TV series Sex and the City
 Frenemies (podcast), a podcast featuring Ethan Klein and Trisha Paytas